Glasgow is an unincorporated community in Tuscarawas County, in the U.S. state of Ohio.

History
Glasgow had its start when Scottish investors built a blast furnace there. The town site was laid out and platted in 1873.

References

Unincorporated communities in Tuscarawas County, Ohio
Unincorporated communities in Ohio